Tim Johnson (born August 27, 1961) is an American film director, film producer, and television director. Johnson is best known for directing the DreamWorks Animation films Antz, Sinbad: Legend of the Seven Seas, Over the Hedge, and Home.

Life and career
Johnson was born in Chicago. He studied at Northwestern University where he earned a BA in English Literature. He also produced two animated films; both of which earned Richter Grant Organization Awards.

Upon graduating, he worked for two years as a freelance animator and director. His introduction to computer animation came in 1985 while he worked on the staff at Post Effects in Chicago. He later joined Pacific Data Images in 1988 and two years later co-founded the studio's Character Animation Group. He also directed the first CG Pillsbury Doughboy commercial.

Johnson won two Annie awards on Antz and Over the Hedge, an Audience Award on Over the Hedge, and a Grand Prize for The Simpsons''' "Treehouse of Horror VI".

While at DreamWorks Animation, he also directed Sinbad: Legend of the Seven Seas, Home (an adaptation of The True Meaning of Smekday), and the Christmas television special Kung Fu Panda Holiday, and additionally served as executive producer for How to Train Your Dragon and Abominable''.

Filmography

Film

Television

References

External links

1961 births
Living people
American film directors
American animators
American film producers
American animated film directors
American animated film producers
Place of birth missing (living people)
DreamWorks Animation people
Annie Award winners
Northwestern University alumni